Dallam may refer to:
Dallam County, Texas, United States
Dallam, Warrington, Cheshire, England
Dallam School, Milnthorpe, Cumbria, England
Dallam Tower, historic house near Milnthorpe, Cumbria, England
Dallam family of English organ-builders
Dallam's Decisions, a private law report for the Republic of Texas

People with surname Dallam 
Thomas Dallam (c. 1570 – after 1614) first of family of organ builders
James Wilmer Dallam, American lawyer and newspaper publisher after whom Dallam County, Texas is named